Cherokee State Park is a  Oklahoma state park located in Mayes County, Oklahoma. It is located near the city of Disney, Oklahoma. The park consists of several smaller parks that are located near the Pensacola Dam and around the lake. The area is known for great fishing and a variety of water sports. Amenities include picnic sites, a group shelter, campsites, playgrounds, comfort stations, lighted boat ramp and a 9-hole golf course.

The lakeside area features a beach for swimming, 12 RV sites, 15 tent sites, a playground, group shelter and comfort station.  The Grand View area features four RV sites with electric service only, 45 tent sites, a group shelter and comfort station.  The Riverside area, located below the Pensacola Dam, features 18 RV sites, 50 tent sites, a group shelter, boat ramp with access to the river and a comfort station.  The Grand Cherokee area, also located below the Pensacola Dam, features 15 RV sites with full hookups and pull-through services.

References

External links
Cherokee Area at Grand Lake State Park

State parks of Oklahoma
State parks of the U.S. Interior Highlands
Protected areas of Mayes County, Oklahoma